Alone is a BBC Radio 4 situation comedy which stars Angus Deayton and is written by Moray Hunter. The show began with a pilot episode in January 2017, with the first series following on 26 April 2018. A third series began on 7 April 2021 followed by a fourth in August 2022.

Cast
 Angus Deayton as Mitch
 Pearce Quigley as Will
 Abigail Cruttenden as Ellie
 Kate Isitt as Louisa
 Bennett Arron as Morris

Plot
Middle-aged and widowed Mitch is living in a converted North London Victorian house, divided into flats, with the house owner and half-brother Will who works as a translator from home. In the neighbouring flats is nervous and shy teacher Ellie who secretly holds a crush on Mitch, frightfully honest but frustrated actress Louisa, and dimwitted IT nerd Morris. All four find their way to bothering Mitch with regularity.

Episodes

Pilot

Series one

Series two

Series three

Series four

Development
The show pilot was commissioned as part of a group of six shows which aired together on 7 January 2017.

The first series was confirmed on 17 August 2017. The return for the second series was announced on 9 January 2018.

Broadcast history
The show originally aired on BBC Radio 4, with repeats also airing the following week on BBC Radio 4 Extra.

References

External links
 British Comedy Guide

BBC Radio comedy programmes
2017 radio programme debuts
BBC Radio 4 programmes